Newman Springs (formerly, Soap Creek Springs) is a set of springs in Lake County, California.
At one time there was a resort at the springs.

Location

They are at an elevation of 2159 feet (658 m).
Soap Creek is named after the borax contained in the spring waters.

Springs

According to G.A. Waring, who visited the springs around 1910,

Resort

The State Mineralogist in 1914 wrote,

References

Sources

 

Springs of Lake County, California
Resorts in Lake County, California